Fanboys 'n Da Hood is the first studio album released by The great Luke Ski under the name "Luke Ski's Psycho Potpourri" in 1996.  This album has been out of print since 2003, and many of its tracks have since been re-released on later compilation collections.  Some tracks were re-recorded for later studio albums, as some of the original recordings used karaoke tracks of the songs parodied as backing music, and backing vocals of the original lyrics were sometimes audible through the parody vocals.

Track listing

"Funny Man" - 4:36
Parody of "Whatta Man" by Salt-N-Pepa featuring En Vogue
A song about the attractiveness of comedians
"Insane and the Brain" - 3:43
Parody of "Insane in the Brain" by Cypress Hill
A song about Animaniacs stars Pinky and the Brain
"My Name Is Fred" - 1:52
Parody of "My Name Is Mud" by Primus
A song about Fred Flintstone, sung a cappella
"Cruis'n USA" - 2:00
Parody of "Surfin' U.S.A." by the Beach Boys
A song about the Nintendo 64 arcade video game Cruis'n USA.
"Spam (Let The Pork Be Pork)" - 3:43
Parody of "Slam" by Onyx
A song about food in general, with an emphasis on Spam.
"KFC Bitch" - 3:07
Parody of "KKK Bitch" by Body Count
A song about Kentucky Fried Chicken
"Star Wars Trilogy Homesick Blues" - 2:16
Parody of "Subterranean Homesick Blues" by Bob Dylan
A song about Star Wars, episodes 4-6
"Y.O.D.A." - 3:40
Parody of "Y.M.C.A." by the Village People
A song about Yoda of Star Wars and the training he gives to Luke Skywalker
"Mystery Science Theatre Picture Show" - 4:26
Parody of "Science Fiction/Double Feature" from the Rocky Horror Picture Show
A song about Mystery Science Theater 3000
"Murder Was The Play" - 4:26
Parody of "Murder Was The Case" by Snoop Dogg
A song that retells the story of Hamlet by William Shakespeare
"Wahdedah-dee" - 3:03
Parody of "Lodi Dodi" by Doug E. Fresh & MC Ricky D.
A song about the puppet characters of "Ray TV", a show produced by Luke Ski and his friends
"Ninja Butt" - 0:25
Mini-parody of "Da Butt" by E.U.
From "Ray TV", a song about the character 'Little White Ninja Man', sung a cappella
"I'm Not A Fishy" - 2:50
Original song, by "Frozen Scream", about not being a fish.  Contains in-jokes from "Ray TV"
"Born To Lose" - 3:54
Parody of "Born To Run" by Bruce Springsteen
A song about being a loser
"What's Up Spock?" - 3:55
Parody of "What's Up Doc? (Can We Rock)" by Fu-Schnickens with Shaquille O'Neal
A song about the first three live-action TV versions of Star Trek
"Fantastic Voyager" - 3:53
Parody of "Fantastic Voyage" by Coolio
A song about the first season of Star Trek: Voyager
"Gowron Said Knock You Out" - 3:39
Parody of "Mama Said Knock You Out" by LL Cool J
A song about the Klingons of Star Trek, set during events from Star Trek: Deep Space Nine
"What's Up Spock? (Schweitzer Remix)" - 4:05
Parody of "What's Up Doc? (Can We Rock?)" by Fu-Schnickens with Shaquille O'Neal
A song about the first four live-action TV versions of Star Trek (A Voyager verse was added, adapted from the final verse of "Fantastic Voyager")
"104.3 Cory Rocks" - 1:01
Original song about the character 'Cory' from "Ray TV".  Sung a cappella
"Barn Dance Fever" - 1:16
Original song, by "Frozen Scream", about barn dancing.  Contains in-jokes from "Ray-TV"

External links

Luke Ski albums
1996 albums